Settawut Wongsai (born 7 May 1997) is a Thai professional footballer who plays as a forward, he has also been used as a winger for Thai League 3 club Pattaya Dolphins United.

International goals

U21

References

1997 births
Living people
Settawut Wongsai
Association football forwards
Settawut Wongsai
Settawut Wongsai
Settawut Wongsai